Rihards Pīks (born December 31, 1941 in Riga) is a Latvian politician and Member of the European Parliament for the People's Party; part of the European People's Party. He served as the Foreign Minister of Latvia from 2004 to 2009.

References

1941 births
Living people
Politicians from Riga
Latvian Farmers' Union politicians
People's Party (Latvia) politicians
For Latvia's Development politicians
Ministers of Culture of Latvia
Ministers of Foreign Affairs of Latvia
Deputies of the 7th Saeima
Deputies of the 8th Saeima
People's Party (Latvia) MEPs
MEPs for Latvia 2004–2009